Tellurite is a rare oxide mineral composed of tellurium dioxide (TeO2).

It occurs as prismatic to acicular transparent yellow to white orthorhombic crystals. It occurs in the oxidation zone of mineral deposits in association with native tellurium, emmonsite and other tellurium minerals. Its name comes from Tellus, which is the Latin name for the planet Earth.

It was first described in 1842 because of an occurrence in Faţa Băii, Zlatna, Alba County, Romania.

References

Oxide minerals
Tellurite and selenite minerals
Orthorhombic minerals
Minerals in space group 61